Sinatle Stadium is a multi-use stadium in Tbilisi, Georgia.  It is used mostly for football matches and is the home stadium of FC Merani Tbilisi. The stadium is able to hold 2,500 people.

Football venues in Tbilisi
Sports venues in Tbilisi